Oncotylus setulosus is a species of plant bugs belonging to the family Miridae, subfamily Phylinae. It is found in Austria, Bulgaria, Czech Republic, France, Germany, Hungary, Moldova, Romania, Slovakia, Spain, Ukraine, and all states of former Yugoslavia (except for Croatia).

References

Insects described in 1837
Hemiptera of Europe
Phylini